Scouting in Maine dates back to the creation of the Katahdin Area Council in 1920 and has continued prominently to the present day.

Boy Scouts of America

History
Boy Scouting started early in Maine, with two local councils in operation by February 1915. The first second class council was in operation by 1916, and by 1917 three second class councils existed, in Auburn, Bath and Saco. South Portland Council began in 1918, as did Waterville Council, but that council apparently only existed for a year.  Bangor, Old Town and Portland Councils were begun in 1919 in those localities, while in that same year Auburn, Bath and Saco's councils all ceased to exist.  Old Town's council ceased to exist in 1920, while Oxford County Council (#219) was formed, with its headquarters in South Paris, Maine.

In 1921, South Portland Council ceased to exist, while a new one, Biddeford & Saco Council, blossomed once again in Saco. Bangor Council opened Camp Roosevelt, believed to be the first council camp in Maine, the same year.  Portland Council changed its name to Cumberland County Council in 1922, no doubt reflecting its expansion beyond the city of Portland (Portland Council had probably absorbed South Portland Council's troops upon its demise the previous year).  No organizational changes appear to have occurred in 1923, but big changes would occur the next year.

In 1924, the leaders of Bangor Council took a step similar to that taken by Portland Council in 1922; they changed the council's name to one more reflective of the region served—Penobscot Council—with the change effective at the New Year.  Meanwhile, Scouting in the Saco area again took a down turn, with Biddeford & Saco Council ceasing to exist. Oxford County Council also ceased to exist in 1924.

In September 1925 organizers formed a council headquartered in Rockland—Pine Tree Council. Camden was added to this council in 1928, but then Pine Tree Council was absorbed into Cumberland County Council in 1929. The latter council had been growing quite nicely already, as it had added eight towns in Oxford County in May 1929.  Also added in 1929 were units in Sagadahoc, Franklin, and Kennebec Counties, as well as those in parts of Knox, Lincoln, and Somerset Counties.  Five more towns in Knox County were added in 1930.

Organizers in Saco tried again in 1927, forming York County Council, which also included units in Biddeford and North Berwick.  Units in Somersworth, New Hampshire joined York County Council in 1929, but that town moved to New Hampshire's Daniel Webster Council in 1932.

In 1929, Penobscot Council changed its name to Katahdin Area Council, possibly reflecting its growth to encompass all of the northern part of Maine. Although there are references to the council being named "Katahdin Council" on Camp Roosevelt patches, it is generally believed that "Area" has been a part of the council name since its inception.

After two decades of growth and consolidation, by the BSA's twentieth anniversary in early 1930, there were just three councils in Maine—Katahdin Area Council, headquartered in Bangor; Cumberland County Council, headquartered in Portland; and York County Council, headquartered in Saco. The 1930s would see the final changes in council organization: at the end of 1932 Cumberland County Council changed its name to Pine Tree Council; and in 1935 York County Council merged into Pine Tree Council.  That merger left Maine with the two councils present there today — Katahdin Area Council in Bangor and Pine Tree Council in Portland.

Katahdin Area Council

The Katahdin Area Council cites 1920 as its starting date, though the Bangor Council (#216) actually began operation in 1919. The Council changed its name to the Penobscot Council (#216), then in 1924 and to the Katahdin Area Council in 1929. The present day Katahdin Area Council (#216) contains , making it the largest council in land area east of the Mississippi. With nearly 3000 adults and 6000 youth, Katahdin Area Council has one of the highest adult-youth ratios in the country. The council center is located in Orono, Maine.

Organization
The Council is broken down into six different districts:
Hancock District
North Star District
Penquis District
Penobscot Valley District
Waldo District
Washington District

Camps

Camp Roosevelt/Katahdin Scout Reservation

Camp Roosevelt or KSR (Katahdin Scout Reservation) is Katahdin Area Council's resident Scouts BSA camp and has been in operation since 1921.

The camp has 19 camp sites and can handle about 500 campers at one time. One of the hallmarks of the camp is the log cabin style Dining lodge - Pamola Lodge which was built in 1929. It remains as one of the largest free standing log cabins in the country.

In 2001, the camp added a COPE program, (Challenging Outdoor Personal Experience) which provides both high and low element activities and challenges for scouts over 14 years old.

In August 2006 the Peter Vigue Scout Center was completed, it includes the Teddy Roosevelt Welcome Room and a Lodge/dining hall that seats 420 people. The prior lodge/dining hall was renamed the Pamola Lodge in 2009 and is now used for program activities with an eye towards insulating to improve opportunities for packs, troops, and crews throughout the winter.

Maine High Adventure BSA
Maine High Adventure BSA, formerly Maine  National High Adventure Area, is operated by the Katahdin Area Council and serves as a high adventure program for Scouts from throughout the country. Hundreds of Scouts and Ventures, enjoy a unique backcountry experience in northern Maine. Much of the almost  open for  exploration remain untouched - as travelers like Henry David Thoreau experienced it over 150 years ago.

Since 1970, Maine High Adventure has been providing customized, fully outfitted, guided trips for youth groups of all kinds. Participants have come from across the country and the world to experience the type of backcountry adventure that is becoming more and more scarce each day. Maine High Adventure provides food, camping equipment, van transportation, and a fully trained "Matagamon guide".

Order of the Arrow

Pamola Lodge 211 is the Order of the Arrow lodge for Katahdin Area Council, serving northern and eastern Maine, and is part of the Northeast Region, Section NE-1. Pamola Lodge encompasses the largest geographical area of any lodge east of the Mississippi and is the most northern lodge in the continental United States. The Lodge was first chartered in 1941, although much of its early history is shrouded in mystery. In 1951 the lodge disbanded only to be rechartered again in 1955. Lodge activity continued to grow in the late 1950s and 1960s with the Lodge's first Vigil ceremony being held in 1961.

The Totem of the Lodge is the Running Moose, which is shown on the flap. The Lodge is named after the legendary Penobscot Indian Spirit of Mount Katahdin, Pamola. Pamola Lodge was one of the few lodges to have retained its original flap for its entire history until 2007 when the flap was reinvented.

In 2006, Pamola Lodge received the National Service Award which was established to recognize lodges in each region that have performed outstanding service, both in qualitative and a quantitative sense, to their council. In 2015, Pamola Lodge received the Section NE-1 Ordeal ceremonies award.

Pine Tree Council

The present-day Pine Tree Council (#218) can trace its beginnings to 1919, when organizers formed Portland Council (#218) in that city.  South Portland Council was formed a year earlier but that council folded in 1921. In 1922 Portland Council became Cumberland County Council (#218), no doubt reflecting its growth outside of the city of Portland. Between 1922 and 1932 Cumberland County Council continued to grow, adding units in Oxford, Sagadahoc, Androscoggin, Franklin, Kennebec, Knox Lincoln, and Somerset counties. The original Pine Tree Council  (#710), formed in Rockland in 1925, merged into Cumberland County Council in 1929, and in 1933 Cumberland County Council became the Pine Tree Council we know today. York County Council  (#217) merged into Pine Tree Council in 1935.

Background
Scouts from Maine have been active throughout the years and had high involvement from the community.

In 1953 39 Scouts traveled to the National Scout Jamboree led by Stanley McCurdy, Millard Neal and Clyde Nason. They were known as special Troop 27.

Districts
The council contains four districts:

Abnaki District
Casco Bay District
Kennebec Valley District
York District

Camps

Camp Bomazeen
Camp Bomazeen is located on Great Pond in North Belgrade, Maine, where on its shores, Screenwriter Ernest Thompson spent his summers as a youth. Thus Great Pond was the inspiration for the screen play "On Golden Pond". Camp Bomazeen was opened in 1946.  For 57 years, the camp provided a long term Boy Scout summer camp experience adding specialty weeks in later years (Be First Class, wilderness survival, mountain man, Indian lore, drama, photography, bike treks, back packing, environmental science, and art among others) along with Webelos camp programs. Summer Camp operations ceased after the 2003 summer season.

Today, Bomazeen with campsites and cabins with wood stoves provides year-round opportunities to packs, troops, crews, and ships; a tremendous site for district camporees; and the venue for Trailblazer days for new Cubs and Parents just joining Scouting.  Wood Badge training courses and Order of the Arrow ordeals are regularly held there.

Pine Tree Council is currently in a fundraising campaign to develop and improve its year-round facilities.  Kennebec Valley District uses camp Bomazeen for summer Cub day camp. Boy Scout resident summer camp is scheduled to return to the camp in the summer of 2014.

In the summer of 2004, Pine Tree Council stopped using Camp Bomazeen as a Summer Camp.  For the next 10 years Camp Bomazeen was used as a day camp for Cub Scouts only.  In 2014 Pine Tree Council re-opened the Camp to Boy Scouts launching a brand new program using specialty themes.  These themes were Maine Junior Woodsman Guide, Nechemis (new scout program), Trades and Technology, and Bush Craft Adventure.

Camp Bomazeen is named for Chief Bomazeen (whose name translates 'keeper of the ceremonial flames') of the Norridgewock tribe of the Wabenaki nation.  The Camp Bomazeen property was donated in 1944 by George G. and Francis M. Averill of Waterville.

Camp Gustin
Located on Loon Pond, Sabattus, Maine, Camporees have been held on this council property since at least 1947. The camp has been a regular site for Abnaki district (surrounding Auburn, Lisbon, Lewiston, Norway, Paris, and Bethel in Androsscoggin and Oxford Counties) events including camporees, Cub events, and district Cub Day Camps.  Although a favorite of Abnaki, many units from other parts of the Council have camped there, taken part in "Beaver" work days, and done service projects to improve campsites.

With open fields and wooded campsites for tenting, a clean water source and latrines, a pond, a pavilion, and back country roads in the area, Camp Gustin hosts troop shakedowns and junior leader training, design-your-own second class rural hiking, troop challenges, Cub family camping, picnics, and field days, and for older Scout retreats.

The camp had been under consideration for sale in order to support other properties and/or relieve council debt, but in November 2010, Pine Tree Council announced its intention to keep the camp as a site for unit outdoor programs for Boy Scouts of all ages.

Camp William Hinds

Camp William Hinds opened in 1927 as the summer camp for Cumberland County Council. The camp was named for the son of the businessman who donated the property to the council.

Scouts use Camp Hinds for a full week-long summer program of aquatics, nature/ecology, Scoutcraft (outdoor skills), archery and riflery, handicraft, ropes course, and climbing. The Ring Dining Hall is a place for family style dining and mealtime programs. The summer camp also has campfire programs. Week-long winter programs during Maine school vacations and winter camping programs based in the Rotary Training Center are popular. Troops and packs use the facilities not just at summer camp but for unit based programs in spring, fall, and winter.

The camp has 14 large, wooded campsites along with three cabins available though Pine Tree Council throughout the year.  Summer camp programs include 7 Scouts BSA weeks and 2 4-day 3-night Webelos camping sessions. Summer Fun Pack Weekends are designed for Cub Scout Packs and their families.

The camp has been extensively used throughout the years. In 1954, the camp hosted an adult leader training for 2,00 volunteers in the area.

The Trading Post once sold many Neal Manufacturing Company slides, manufactured by C. Millard Neal, a volunteer in the Pine Tree Council. The Scout Museum at the Pine Tree Council offices has a display on these nationally popular plastic slides. The slides featured every imaginable Scout image. Some came pre-painted but most scouts bought the plain ones and painted them themselves.

Camp Nutter
Camp William Nutter, located on Loon Pond in Acton, Maine, was originally the summer camp for York County Council.  When that council merged into Pine Tree Council in 1935, it was initially not used as a summer camp; however, sometime after 1944 the council opened it as a summer camp. It operated as such into the 1950s. The earliest dated patch is 1949. The council still owns the property, but it is only used by the York District for weekend events & Cub Scout Day Camp.

Order of the Arrow
Madockawanda Lodge 271 is the Order of the Arrow Lodge for the Pine Tree Council, serving scouts in central and southern Maine. It is a part of the Section NE-1 of the Northeast Region. Madockawanda Lodge has continuously operated since its founding in 1944 at Camp Hinds. Madockawanda Lodge was founded by Frank W.P. Bailey, a long time staff member of Camp Hinds. Bailey gave the name Madockawanda, after the story of the great Indian Chief Madockawanda who unified the Penobscot Nation. The Lodge totem is the snapping turtle.

In the early years, chapters of the Lodge were located at the Council's summer camp facilities (Hinds, Bomazeen). Camp Nutter was the summer camp of the former York County Council. They had adopted a different honor society, the "Nikiwigi", and a period of negotiation was required before Camp Nutter OA chapter replaced the Nikiwigi tribe there. The chapter was active for only a few years before summer camp operations ceased at Nutter, and the chapter disbanded.

As the elections moved from summer camp to units, camp based chapters co-existed with chapters divided along the lines of the Council's districts. Each camp chapter had a Lodge Vice Chief that supervised the districts closest to his camp.

The Lodge inducted its first Vigil Honor member (& the first Vigil Honor member in any Maine Council) in 1952 when founder Frank W.P. Bailey was inducted and given the name Sirus.  The Lodge continued the tradition of star and constellation based Vigil names until 1971.

Four members of Madockawanda have received the National Distinguished Service Award, numerous youth and adults have served as Section officers and advisers. In 2000, Madockawanda Lodge was one of eight Lodges to receive the first National Service Award.  It also earned the award in 2006, 2008 and 2009.  It holds the record for the most National Service Awards awarded to a single lodge in the Northeast Region.  Madockawanda has received quality lodge recognition 14 years since 1991.

Girl Scouts of the USA

Girl Scouts of Maine

The sole Maine Girl Scout council, Girl Scouts of Maine, formed in October 2007 by the merger of Abnaki Girl Scout Council and Girl Scouts of Kennebec Council. It serves over 14,000 girls and has about 4,000 adult volunteers and is headquartered in South Portland, Maine.

History
The first known active troop in Maine was in 1917 in Augusta. Abnaki Girl Scout Council was established in the northern part of Maine in 1962 from Bangor-Brewer, Central Penobscot, Presque Isle and Houlton councils and many lone troops.  Girl Scouts of Kennebec Council was established in 1963 from 11 southern Maine councils and again many lone troops.

Organization
Service Centers:
Bangor, Maine
Presque Isle, Maine
South Portland, Maine

Camps
Kirkwold is in Readfield
Natarswi is in Baxter State Park near Millinocket

See also

 Neal Manufacturing Company
 Scouting in New Brunswick
 Scouting in Québec
 Scouting in New Hampshire

References

External links

Youth organizations based in Maine
Maine
Northeast Region (Boy Scouts of America)